Thomas Augustine Hartrey MBE (31 January 1901 – 17 November 1983) was an Australian politician. He was the Labor member for Boulder-Dundas in the Western Australian Legislative Assembly from 1971 to 1977.

References

1901 births
Members of the Western Australian Legislative Assembly
Members of the Order of the British Empire
Place of birth missing
Australian Labor Party members of the Parliament of Western Australia
People from Boulder, Western Australia
1983 deaths
20th-century Australian politicians